This is a list of RC Strasbourg Alsace's managers from 1928, with their records from 1934, the first year the club played in Ligue 1.

Definition
This list contains only the "entraîneurs", i.e. the staff member responsible for first team coaching on a day-to-day basis (including training, tactical choices, team selection for every match and in-game substitutions). In French football, this post is frequently separated from the more general team policy (finances, transfers, scouting, youth development), attributed to a "directeur sportif" or  general manager . For example, between 1998 and 1999 Pierre Mankowski was the "entraîneur" responsible for the first team while Claude Le Roy was acting as "manager général" with extensive power on the squad's roster and transfer policy. When Mankowski was sacked, Le Roy replaced him and cumulated both functions as a British manager would do.

Records
Racing has had 46 managers in the professional era, with the holder of the office changing 56 times. This is a record in French football only surpassed by Olympique de Marseille. Gilbert Gress holds the record for the longest serving manager at the club, both for a single spell (39 months btw. 1977-80, 152 matches) and overall (75 months in two spells, 273 matches). Paul Frantz holds the record for the most spells at Racing with four (73 months overall, 227 matches). Jacky Duguépéroux is the only manager to win two trophies with Strasbourg.

Complete list

Key
* Served as caretaker manager.

References

Managers